Suguru Shigeno is a Japanese mixed martial artist. He competed in the Middleweight division.

Mixed martial arts record

|-
| Loss
| align=center| 2-5-5
| Kazuhiro Sakamoto
| Submission (armbar)
| Shooto - Shooto
| 
| align=center| 2
| align=center| 0:55
| Tokyo, Japan
| 
|-
| Win
| align=center| 2-4-5
| Hiroaki Matsutani
| Decision (unanimous)
| Shooto - Shooto
| 
| align=center| 4
| align=center| 3:00
| Tokyo, Japan
| 
|-
| Win
| align=center| 1-4-5
| Mamoru Okochi
| Decision (unanimous)
| Shooto - Shooto
| 
| align=center| 3
| align=center| 3:00
| Tokyo, Japan
| 
|-
| Loss
| align=center| 0-4-5
| Tomohiro Tanaka
| KO
| Shooto - Shooto
| 
| align=center| 3
| align=center| 0:00
| Tokyo, Japan
| 
|-
| Draw
| align=center| 0-3-5
| Hiroyuki Kanno
| Draw
| Shooto - Shooto
| 
| align=center| 3
| align=center| 3:00
| Tokyo, Japan
| 
|-
| Draw
| align=center| 0-3-4
| Hiroaki Matsutani
| Draw
| Shooto - Shooto
| 
| align=center| 3
| align=center| 3:00
| Tokyo, Japan
| 
|-
| Draw
| align=center| 0-3-3
| Tomoyuki Saito
| Draw
| Shooto - Shooto
| 
| align=center| 3
| align=center| 3:00
| Tokyo, Japan
| 
|-
| Loss
| align=center| 0-3-2
| Tomonori Ohara
| Decision (unanimous)
| Shooto - Shooto
| 
| align=center| 3
| align=center| 3:00
| Tokyo, Japan
| 
|-
| Draw
| align=center| 0-2-2
| Junichi Kubota
| Draw
| Shooto - Shooto
| 
| align=center| 3
| align=center| 3:00
| Tokyo, Japan
| 
|-
| Draw
| align=center| 0-2-1
| Tomoyuki Saito
| Draw
| Shooto - Shooto
| 
| align=center| 3
| align=center| 3:00
| Tokyo, Japan
| 
|-
| Loss
| align=center| 0-2
| Kazuhiro Sakamoto
| Submission (armbar)
| Shooto - Shooto
| 
| align=center| 2
| align=center| 0:00
| Tokyo, Japan
| 
|-
| Loss
| align=center| 0-1
| Mitsuo Fujikura
| Submission (kimura)
| Shooto - Shooto
| 
| align=center| 2
| align=center| 0:00
| Tokyo, Japan
|

See also
List of male mixed martial artists

References

External links
 
 Suguru Shigeno at mixedmartialarts.com

Japanese male mixed martial artists
Lightweight mixed martial artists
Living people
Year of birth missing (living people)